Vandenberg or Vandenburg is a surname that is a variation on the Dutch and Flemish surname "van den Berg", literally meaning "from the mountain" (a Dutch reference to a somewhat higher place in the landscape). The version treating it as a single word is current mainly in English-speaking countries. 

Notable people with the name include:

 Adrian Vandenberg, Dutch guitarist who has worked with Whitesnake
 Arielle Vandenberg, American actress
 Arthur H. Vandenberg (1884–1951), U.S. Senator from Michigan
 Arthur H. Vandenberg, Jr. (1907–1968), government official, politician, son of the U.S. Senator
 Don VandenBerg, Canadian astronomer
 Hoyt Vandenberg (1899–1954), second Chief of Staff of the Air Force of the United States
 Hoyt S. Vandenberg, Jr. (born 1928), U.S. military officer
 James Vandenberg, quarterback for the University of Iowa Hawkeyes
Joanna Maria Vandenberg (born 1938), Dutch crystallographer based in USA
 Kim Vandenberg, American swimmer
 Malcolm VandenBurg, English doctor
 Richie Vandenberg (born 1977), Australian rules footballer

See also
Van den Berg, surname
Vandenbergh, surname
Vanderburg, surname